The End of the World is an LP album by Julie London, released by Liberty Records under catalog number LRP-3300 as a monophonic recording and catalog number LST-7300 in stereo in June 1963. This was Julie London's second-to-last charting album, reaching number 127 on the Billboard charts.

This Julie London album is commonly mistaken to be entitled "The Good Life", due to mistitling on the album jacket's spine. This error happened again on her 1964 self-titled album "Julie London", when it was mistitled as "You Don't Have to Be a Baby to Cry/Wives and Lovers" on the album jacket's spine.

Ernie Freeman arranged and conducted the orchestra.

Track listing

Notes

References

Owen, Michael (2017). Go Slow: The Life of Julie London. Chicago Review Press.

Liberty Records albums
1963 albums
Julie London albums
Albums arranged by Ernie Freeman
Albums produced by Snuff Garrett